Csaba Somogyi (born 7 April 1985) is a Hungarian football player who plays as a goalkeeper for Austrian club SV OK Haus Großpetersdorf.

Career
After playing for several years in his native Hungary, on 8 July 2011 Somogyi signed for English club Fulham from Hungarian side Rákospalotai EAC on a one-year deal, with the option to extend his contract by a further year until 2013, after having impressed the new Fulham manager Martin Jol during an earlier trial at Jol's former club Ajax.

Somogyi made the bench for the first time as substitute goalkeeper for Fulham's away Premier League game against West Bromwich Albion at The Hawthorns on 1 January 2013.

On 28 March 2013, Somogyi joined Conference National side Dartford on loan until the end of the season. He kept a clean sheet on his debut, a 0–0 away draw with Newport County.

Somogyi was one of twelve players released by Fulham at the end of the 2012–2013 Premier League season.

In August 2019, Somogyi joined Austrian club SV OK Haus Großpetersdorf.

References

External links 
 
 

1985 births
Living people
Sportspeople from Dunaújváros
Hungarian footballers
Hungarian expatriate footballers
Association football goalkeepers
Győri ETO FC players
Integrál-DAC footballers
Hévíz FC footballers
Rákospalotai EAC footballers
Fulham F.C. players
Dartford F.C. players
Gyirmót FC Győr players
Szolnoki MÁV FC footballers
Budapest Honvéd FC players
Budafoki LC footballers
Mosonmagyaróvári TE 1904 footballers
Nemzeti Bajnokság I players
National League (English football) players
Nemzeti Bajnokság II players
Hungarian expatriate sportspeople in England
Hungarian expatriate sportspeople in Austria
Expatriate footballers in England
Expatriate footballers in Austria